Caitlin is a female given name of Irish origin. Historically, the Irish name Caitlín was anglicized as Cathleen or Kathleen.

It is the Irish version of the Old French name Cateline , which comes from Catherine, which in turn comes from the Ancient Greek Αἰκατερίνη (Aikaterine). Catherine is attributed to St. Catherine of Alexandria. Along with the many other variants of Catherine, it is generally believed to mean "pure" because of its long association with the Greek adjective καθαρός katharos (pure), though the name did not evolve from this word.

Notable people

Literature
 Caitlin Brennan, pseudonym of Judith Tarr, American fantasy writer
 Cait Brennan, American screenwriter and performer
 Caitlin Davies, English writer
 Caitlin Flanagan, American writer and social critic
 Caitlin R. Kiernan, American dark fantasy and sci-fi author
 Caitlin Matthews, British author
 Caitlin Moran, English journalist and columnist
 Caitlin Thomas, formerly Caitlin Macnamara, British author, wife of poet and writer Dylan Thomas

Film and television
 Caitlin Carmichael, American movie actress
 Caitlin Clarke, American theatre and film actress
 Caitlin Stasey, Australian actress
 Caitlin Wachs, American actress
 Caitlin FitzGerald, American actress and filmmaker
 Caitlin Carmichael, American child actress
 Caitlin Sanchez, American voice of the animated character Dora the Explorer
 Caitlin Glass, American voice actress
 Caitlin McCarthy, American actress
 Kaitlin Colombo, American comedian
 Caitlin/Caity Lotz, American actress, dancer, singer
 Kaitlyn Dever, American actress

Music
 Caitlin Cary, American alternative country musician
Caitlin Hanford, American and Canadian singer/songwriter and member of Quartette and The Marigolds
 Caitlin Lynn, of the country music duo Caitlin & Will
 Caitlín Maude, Irish poet, singer and language activist
 Kaitlyn Maher, American singer from America's Got Talent
 Caitlín O'Riordan, British bass guitarist (The Pogues)
 Katelyn Tarver (born 1989), American singer/songwriter
 Caitlyn Taylor Love, American singer/actress
 Caitlin Rose, American singer

Politicians
 Caitlín Brugha, née Kingston, Irish politician

Sports
 Caitlin Bassett, Australian netball player
 Caitlin Campbell, New Zealand footballer
 Caitlin Cahow, American ice hockey player
 Caitlin Carruthers, better known as Kitty Carruthers, American figure skater
 Katlyn Chookagian, American MMA fighter
 Caitlin Clark, American basketball player
 Caitlin Cooper, Australian association footballer
 Caitlin Cunningham, Australian basketball player
 Caitlyn Edwards, Australian rules footballer
 Kaitlin Hawayek, American ice dancer
 Caitlyn Jenner, American track & field athlete, gold medalist at the 1976 Olympics
 Kaitlyn Lawes, Canadian curler
 Caitlin Lever, Canadian softball player and Olympian
 Caitlin Leverenz, American swimmer
 Caitlin Lowe, American softball player and Olympian
 Caitlin Mallory, American-born ice dancer
 Caitlin McClatchey, Scottish swimmer
 Caitlin Munoz, Australian association footballer
 Katelyn Ohashi, American gymnast
 Caitlin Parker (born 1996), Australian boxer
 Caitlin Rooskrantz (born 2001), South African gymnast
 Caitlin Ryan, New Zealand canoeist
 Kaitlyn (wrestler), ring name of American professional wrestler Celeste Bonin in WWE
 Kaitlin Sandeno, American swimmer
 Kaitlyn Vincie, American sports presenter and journalist

Others
 Caitlin Brunell, Miss Alabama 2015
 Katelynn Cusanelli, American reality TV personality from The Real World: Brooklyn
 Caitlin Hill, Australian YouTube personality (username "stageTheHill88")
 Caitlin Kinney, American dancer and So You Think You Can Dance (season 5) contestant
 Catelynn Lowell, American reality TV personality of the MTV shows 16 and Pregnant and Teen Mom
 Caitlin Myers, American professor of economics
Caitlin Rivers, American epidemiologist

Fictional characters
 Catelyn Stark, from the A Song of Ice and Fire book series and television series
 Caitlin's Way, US-Canadian live action children’s drama
 Caitlin, in the second season of the TV series Heroes
 Caitlin, in the Pokémon series; first introduced in the Sinnoh Battle Frontier, she was later revealed to be an Unova Elite Four member
Caitlyn Kiramman, the Sheriff of Piltover, a playable champion character in video game League of Legends and character in the animated series Arcane
 Kait(lyn), in the webcomic Freakangels
 Caitlin Atkins, from Australian television series Neighbours
 Caitlin Bree, from 1994 movie Clerks
 Caitlin Cooke, from the show 6teen
 Kaitlin Cooper, from American television series The O.C.
 Caitlin Deschanel, from American television series Sunset Beach
 Caitlin Fairchild, from the comic Gen¹³
 Caitlyn Goodwin, from American dub of the Japanese anime series Ojamajo Doremi
 Caitlin Pike, from American television series JAG
Caitlin Poythress, from the television series We Are Who We Are
 Caitlin Ramirez, from The Bold and the Beautiful
 Caitlin Ryan, from the Degrassi television series
 Caitlin Snow (also known as Killer Frost) from the CW's The Flash
 Caitlin O'Shannessy, from the American television series Airwolf
 Caitlin Todd, from the American television series NCIS
 Caitlin the Streamlined engine, a recurring character in the television series Thomas & Friends

Other uses of the name
 Typhoon Caitlin (disambiguation), two tropical cyclones

See also
 Cathleen
 Kathleen (disambiguation)
 Kathleen (given name)

References

Irish-language feminine given names